Ajax was a  of the French Navy launched in 1930 at Brest, France. It participated in the Second World War, first on the side of the Allies from 1939 to 1940 then on the side of the Axis for the rest of the war.

Construction and Characteristics

Ajax was ordered as part of the French fleet expansion program from in 1926. The project was an improvement of the first post-war French submarines - the Requin type. The design was designed to be especially faster and more maneuverable over the previous class, as well as a larger range and larger weapons storing capacities.

Ajax was one of 31 Redoutable-class submarines, also designated as the 1500 ton boats because of their displacement. The class entered service between 1931 and 1939.

The submarines' electrical propulsion allowed them to attain speeds of  while submerged.

Ordered in 1927, Ajax was laid down on 1 September 1928 at the Brest Arsenal. She was launched on 28 May 1930; and commissioned on 1 February 1934.

Second World War
At the start of World War II, Ajax was assigned to the 6th Submarine Division, based in Brest, along with her sister ships Persée, Archimède and Poncelet. In April 1940, with her sister ship Archimède, she escorted convoy HX 41 from Halifax to Britain. In front of the advancing German forces, she left Brest along 6:30 pm with thirteen other French submarines and one tanker. The force arrived at Casablanca on 23 June. After the Attack on Mers-el-Kébir, she patrolled along the Moroccan coast.

On 23 September 1940, she arrived at Dakar with Persée and Poncelet. On the 23rd, she sighted the British force preparing to attack Dakar. She turned to attack it along with Persée, who was quickly sunk by British depth charges. Ajax itself was forced to crash-dive and was then depth charged, but sustained only minor damage. The next day, she attempted to torpedo the battleships  and  but was detected on sonar and critically damaged by depth charges from the destroyer . She was forced to surface and scuttled by its crew, most of which was then rescued by lifeboats from Fortune.

References

Citations

Sources
 
 
 
 
 

Redoutable-class submarines (1928)
1930 ships
Ships built in France
World War II submarines of France
Lost submarines of France
Maritime incidents in September 1940
Submarines sunk by British warships
Scuttled vessels
World War II shipwrecks in the Atlantic Ocean